Hopedale Air Station (ADC ID: N-28) is a General Surveillance Radar station that the USAF closed in 1968.

History
The site was established in 1953 as a General Surveillance Radar station, funded by the United States Air Force. It was used initially by the Northeast Air Command as part of the Pinetree Line, which stationed the 923d Aircraft Control and Warning Squadron at the station on 1 October 1953.

The station was reassigned to the USAF Air Defense Command on 1 April 1957, and was given designation "N-28". The station functioned as a Ground-Control Intercept (GCI) and warning station.  As a GCI station, the squadron's role was to guide interceptor aircraft toward unidentified intruders picked up on the unit's radar scopes. These interceptors were assigned to the 64th Air Division at Goose AFB, Labrador.

It operated the following radars:
 Search Radars: AN/FPS-3C, AN/FPS-502, AN/FPS-87A, AN/FPS-93A
 Height Radars: AN/TPS-502, AN/FPS-6B, AN/FPS-90

In addition to the main facility, Hopedale operated an AN/FPS-14 manned Gap Filler sites:
 Cape Makkovik Air Station    (N-28A): 

N-28A was built in 1957 about 50 miles east-southeast of the main station and was closed in 1961. It was serviced year round by a helicopter landing pad midway between the dock and the main site and by a small dock where supply ships apparently provided logistical support to the station during the summer months.

USAF Military Personnel stationed at Hopedale lived in barracks interconnected and guyed into the bedrock. Canadian non-military personnel lived in the village of Hopedale, about half a mile south-southeast of the site. An airstrip on Ribback Island provided air support to the station. There was no airstrip support for the site in 1964. The squadron was inactivated on 18 June 1968, and the station was closed on 30 June. All US Air Force personnel lived in barracks at the station itself. There were three "tiers" of barracks: Enlisted, NCO and Officer. There were a few Canadian nationals employed at the base. They lived in the village of Hopedale.

In 2009, a serious PCB contamination was identified at the former Hopedale station.

Other than civil communications towers presently in use, the hilltop site has remained largely unused and abandoned since its closure. It is accessible via a maintained gravel road originating from the village of Hopedale, NL. This road branches into two directions: southwest to the former radar station site and north to the former barracks. Large concrete foundations remain intact at both locations.

USAF units and assignments
Units:
 Activated as 923d Aircraft Control and Warning Squadron at Grenier AFB, New Hampshire, 13 June 1953
 Moved to Hopedale Air Station, 1 October 1953 
 Inactivated 18 June 1968.

Assignments:
 64th Air Division (NEAC), 1 October 1953
 4732d Air Defense Group (ADC), 1 April 1957
 Goose Air Defense Sector, 1 April 1960
 37th Air Division, 1 April 1966 – 18 June 1968

Mid-Canada Line

In 1956, a bistatic radar transmitter was constructed at Hopedale as the Sector Control Station (Site 200) for the Mid-Canada Line.

North Warning System

Since 1992, the Canadian Forces have operated a Short Range Radar facility at a nearby site, as part of the North Warning System.

See also
 List of USAF Aerospace Defense Command General Surveillance Radar Stations

References

  A Handbook of Aerospace Defense Organization 1946 - 1980,  by Lloyd H. Cornett and Mildred W. Johnson, Office of History, Aerospace Defense Center, Peterson Air Force Base, Colorado
 Winkler, David F. (1997), Searching the skies: the legacy of the United States Cold War defense radar program. Prepared for United States Air Force Headquarters Air Combat Command.
 Information for Hopedale AS, NL

Radar stations of the United States Air Force
Installations of the United States Air Force in Canada
Military installations in Newfoundland and Labrador
Military installations closed in 1968
Military installations established in 1953
1953 establishments in Newfoundland and Labrador
1968 disestablishments in Newfoundland and Labrador